Allison Plantation is a historic home and farm complex located near York, York County, South Carolina. The main house was built about 1860, and is a -story, frame Greek Revival style dwelling. It has a two-room one-story frame ell and two-story pedimented portico supported by square columns. Also on the property are a one-story frame barn, remains of the detached log kitchen, a concrete pedestal for a windmill, a spring house, smokehouse, mill, and the dilapidated remains of Dr. Allison's Drugstore. It was the home of Dr. Robert Turner Allison, a locally prominent physician and politician.

It was added to the National Register of Historic Places in 1980.

References

Houses on the National Register of Historic Places in South Carolina
Farms on the National Register of Historic Places in South Carolina
Greek Revival houses in South Carolina
Houses completed in 1860
Houses in York County, South Carolina
National Register of Historic Places in York County, South Carolina